María del Cerro (born March 20, 1985)  is an Argentine model, actress, television presenter and fashion designer.

Career 
She started her career, participating in the reality show Super M 2002. 

In 2006, she debuted as an actress in the youth television series Alma Pirata. 

In 2007, she was part of the cast of the youth television series  Romeo y Julieta.

From 2008 until 2010, she played Melody Paz, in the series Casi Ángeles. Also with Casi Ángeles she has toured Argentina, Chile, Spain, Israel, Italy, Mexico, Panama and Peru. 

In 2011, she participated as Carolina in the first season of the television series Los únicos alongside Mariano Martínez, Nicolás Cabré, Nicolás Vázquez, Griselda Siciliani, Brenda Asnicar, María Eugenia Suárez, Jimena Barón, Claudia Fontán, Arnaldo André, Eugenia Tobal, Marcelo Mazzarello and Pepe Monje. 

In 2012, she integrates the cast of the television series Lobo, on the screen of Canal 13. 

From 2012 to 2013, she was part of the cast of the television series Dulce Amor. 

In 2013, she acts in the miniseries Sandía con vino and debuts as a host of the program Yups. At the end of 2013 she presented her own line of swimsuits with  Sweet Victorian, under the name of Mery. 

From 2013 to 2014, she was part of the cast of the television series Taxxi, amores cruzados.

In 2014, she acts in the play Algunas mujeres a las que les cagué la vida alongside Marcelo Cosentino, María Fernanda Callejón, Miriam Lanzoni and Laura Bruni. 

On television she host with Pablo Rago, Studio Movie Plus, for Studio Universal until the beginning of 2015. 

In 2015, she works in her new line of swimsuits with Sweet Victorian
and participate in the movie Chicos Católicos Apostólicos y Romanos. 

In 2016, she participated in the dance reality show Bailando 2016. That same year she hosted Vestido de novia, for the television network Discovery Home & Health.

In 2017 she is fully dedicated to acting in theater and she works in the play Como el culo.

From 2017 to 2018, she was part of the cast of the television series Golpe al corazón.

In 2018, she host with Marcelo Polino Los especialistas del show, on the screen of Canal 9. In 2018, she makes a small participation in the television series Mi hermano es un clon.

In 2019, she host El Challenge: Desafío de Estilistas, on the screen of Telefe.

In 2021, she makes a small participation in the television series Pequeñas Victorias.

Television programs

Television

Theater

Movies

References

External links 
 

1985 births
Argentine actresses
Argentine female models
21st-century Argentine women singers
Argentine stage actresses
Argentine television actresses
Living people
Singers from Buenos Aires
21st-century Argentine women
Participants in Argentine reality television series
Bailando por un Sueño (Argentine TV series) participants